is a Japanese footballer who plays as a forward for Albirex Niigata.

Club career
Komi made his professional debut in a 4–1 Emperor's Cup match against Zweigen Kanazawa.

Career statistics

Club

References

External links

2002 births
Living people
Association football people from Saitama Prefecture
Japanese footballers
Japan youth international footballers
Association football forwards
J2 League players
Albirex Niigata players